The Jarmelista is a cattle breed from Continental Portugal, near Serra da Estrela. It is primarily used for beef.

Habitat
The breed region is circumscribed exclusively to the Central Portugal in Guarda district.

References 
Porter, V., Alderson, L., Hall, S. and Sponenberg, P. (2016). Masons' World Encyclopedia of Livestock Breeds and Breeding. 6th ed. Boston: CAB International, p.211.
Guarda. (2019). Retrieved from https://portugal.com/portugal/cities/guarda

External links

Cattle breeds
Cattle breeds originating in Portugal